The South Dakota Dept. of Transportation Bridge No. 48-244-204 is a historic bridge over the Little White River just west of White River, South Dakota.  At  in length, it is the longest concrete slab bridge in the state.  It was built in 1934 to carry South Dakota Highway 44 across the river, but now carries a local road north of that road's current alignment.  The bridge consists of eighteen concrete slabs, each  in length, resting on a series of concrete piers, with wing-walled concrete abutments at both ends.

The bridge is closed and posted for no trespassing. 

The bridge was listed on the National Register of Historic Places in 1993.

See also
List of bridges on the National Register of Historic Places in South Dakota
National Register of Historic Places listings in Mellette County, South Dakota

References

Road bridges on the National Register of Historic Places in South Dakota
Bridges completed in 1936
Buildings and structures in Mellette County, South Dakota
National Register of Historic Places in Mellette County, South Dakota
1936 establishments in South Dakota
Concrete bridges in the United States